The 1998 Vuelta a Andalucía was the 44th edition of the Vuelta a Andalucía (Ruta del Sol) cycle race and was held on 15 February to 19 February 1998. The race started in Seville and finished in Granada. The race was won by Marcelino García.

Teams
Nineteen teams of up to eight riders started the race:

 
 
 
 
 
 
 
 
 
 
 
 
 Troiamarisco
 
 Palmans–Ideal

General classification

References

Vuelta a Andalucia
Vuelta a Andalucía by year
1998 in Spanish sport